The Evil Eye is an extant 1917 American silent drama film produced by Jesse Lasky and distributed by Paramount Pictures. It was directed by George Melford and stars Blanche Sweet. A copy is preserved at the Library of Congress.

Cast
Blanche Sweet as Dr. Katherine Torrance
Tom Forman as Leonard Sheldon
Webster Campbell as Frank King
J. Parks Jones as Clifford Sheldon
Walter Long as Mexican Joe
Ruth King as Rosa
William Dale as Michael
Edythe Chapman

References

External links

1917 films
American silent feature films
Films directed by George Melford
Films based on short fiction
Paramount Pictures films
1917 drama films
Silent American drama films
American black-and-white films
1910s American films